van Ruisdael can refer to

 Jacob van Ruisdael (1629 – 1682), Dutch painter, draughtsman, and etcher, the most famous artist of the name
 Isaack van Ruisdael (1599 – c. 1677), a Dutch Golden Age painter, brother to Salomon the father of Jacob
 Salomon van Ruysdael (1602 – 1670) Dutch Golden Age landscape painter. He was the uncle of Jacob van Ruisdael
 Jacob Salomonsz van Ruysdael (1629 – 1681), the son of Salomon van Ruysdael and the cousin of Jacob Isaakszoon van Ruisdael

Family tree